Dhenkanal College, officially Dhenkanal Autonomous College, is an autonomous college located at Dhenkanal, Odisha, India. It Provides undergraduate and post-graduate programs in commerce, sciences and liberal arts. It is affiliated to Utkal University.

History
Dhenkanal Autonomous College was established in 1959 and was granted autonomous status in 2002. After the UGC facing the possible loss of autonomy in 2019, the UGC granted the institute an extension of the status until 2023.

References

External links
 

Department of Higher Education, Odisha
Autonomous Colleges of Odisha
Universities and colleges in Odisha
Dhenkanal district
Educational institutions established in 1959
1959 establishments in Orissa